National Lampoon's Thanksgiving Family Reunion is a 2003 television film about a Thanksgiving family reunion of the Sniders, starring Bryan Cranston as Woodrow Snider, Judge Reinhold as Dr. Mitch Snider and Penelope Ann Miller as Jill Snider. The film was released as National Lampoon's Holiday Reunion in some regions.

Cast
 Bryan Cranston – Woodrow Snider
 Judge Reinhold – Dr. Mitch Snider
 Penelope Ann Miller – Pauline Snider
 Hallie Todd – Jill Snider
 Meghan Ory – Allison Snider
 Calum Worthy – Danny Snider
 Britt Irvin – Twig Snider
 Reece Thompson – Harley Snider
 Antony Holland – Uncle Phil
 David Paetkau – Jimmy Hodges
 Garry Chalk – Fred Hodges
 Noel Fisher – Buzz Hodges
 Paul McGillion – Sheriff Kirkland
 Kris Pope – Jock #2
 Dagmar Midcap – TV Reporter

See also
 List of National Lampoon films

References

External links
 
 

2003 television films
2003 films
National Lampoon films
American television films
Films directed by Neal Israel
Films scored by Robert Folk
Thanksgiving in films